The 2015 Metro Manila Film Festival (MMFF) is the 41st edition of the annual Metro Manila Film Festival held in Metro Manila and throughout the Philippines.  It organized by the Metropolitan Manila Development Authority (MMDA, a government agency. During the  festival, no foreign films are shown in Philippine theaters (except IMAX, 4D, and large format 3D theaters).

The festival began on December 23, 2015, kicking off with the traditional Parada ng mga Artista (Parade of the Stars) float parade from Mall of Asia in Pasay to Quirino Grandstand in Manila. Showings are from December 25 until January 7.

The Gabi ng Parangal (Awards Night) was held on December 27 at the Kia Theatre, Araneta Center, Quezon City, hosted by KC Concepcion and Richard Gutierrez. Both the Parade of Stars and the Awards Night are aired via delayed telecast on TV5 thru a co-production with Viva Entertainment.

Metro Manila Film Festival reported that the total earnings of the festival was 1 billion pesos (Dec. 25-Jan. 6 only).  It did not report the earnings for each film.

This was the only festival under MMDA chairman Emerson Carlos.

Entries

Regular entries
The official list of entries was announced on June 20, 2015. From the 21 submissions, 8 were chosen for the festival.

New Wave entries

Feature films
The New Wave entries were screened on selected cinemas from December 17 to December 24, 2015.

Short films
 Daisy - Brian Reyes
 Ding Mangasyas (Tough Guys) - Justine Emmanuel Dizon
 Lapis - Maricel Cariaga
 Momento - Kyle Nieva
 Mumu - Che Tagyamon

Animated films
 8 - Johanna Kay Boncodin
 Buttons- Marvel Obemio, Francis Ramirez & Jared Garcia
 Geo - John Aurthur Mercader
 Little Lights - Rivelle Mallari
 Marvino's League of Superheroes - Ja Marti Escandor

Awards

Major awards 

The following are the winners of the mainstream category:

Other awards
Plaque of Appreciation – Francis Tolentino
Male Celebrity of the Night – Cesar Montano
Female Celebrity of the Night – Jennylyn Mercado

New Wave category
The following are the winners of the New Wave category:

Best Picture – ARI: My Life with a King
Best Director – John Paul Su, Toto
Best Actor – JM de Guzman, Tandem & Francisco Guinto, ARI: My Life with a King
Best Supporting Actor – Thou Reyes, Toto
Best Supporting Actress – Bibeth Orteza, Toto
Best Screenplay – Robert Tantingco, ARI: My Life with a King
Special Jury Prize – Toto
Manila Bulletin Entertainment Best Picture – ARI: My Life with a King
Best Short Film – Mumu by Jean Cheryl Tagyamon
Short Film Special Jury Prize – Daisy by Brian Reyes
Manila Bulletin Entertainment Best Short Film – Momento by Jan-Kyle Nieva
Best Animation Film – Buttons by Marvel Obemio, Francis Ramirez & Jared Garcia
Animation Film Special Jury Prize – Lights Lights by Rivelle Mallari
Manila Bulletin Entertainment Best Animation Film – Geo by John Aurthur Mercader

Multiple awards

Mainstream

New Wave

Controversies

Ticket-swapping incidents
Alleged ticket-swapping incidents occurred in some branches of SM Cinema during the opening day of the festival. Some moviegoers claimed that they bought tickets for My Bebe Love but instead, were given tickets for Beauty and the Bestie. SM Cinema confirmed through its Twitter account that this incident occurred in SM City Bacoor. According to SM Cinema, the incident was "a mistake due to high volume of tickets purchased". They also assured the public that this transaction will be counted fairly for the gross sales of My Bebe Love. These tweets were later deleted for unknown reasons.

On the other hand, the Metro Manila Film Festival committee released a contrary statement regarding this issue. It is stated that they "strongly denies the existence of such" incident and they called the issue "baseless".

The House committee on Metro Manila Development, chaired by Quezon City Representative Winston Castelo, started the probe on the disqualification case of Honor Thy Father and the ticket-swapping incidents in January 2016.

Honor Thy Father disqualification
On December 26, Honor Thy Father, was disqualified by the Metro Manila Film Festival Executive Committee from the Best Picture category after the film failed to disclose its participation as the opening film of the 2015 Cinema One Originals Film Festival. On the contrary, Dondon Monteverde, the film's producer, revealed that they did disclose this information beforehand. He attested that its premiere at the Cinema One festival didn't generate revenue which complies by the rules. He also questioned the timing of this decision, one day before the awards ceremony, and he demanded an investigation.

In an interview dated on November 2, 2015, MMFF Executive Committee member Dominic Du revealed to Philippine Entertainment Portal that the film did comply with the rules as the Cinema One premiere wasn't a commercial screening.

On December 28, Laguna Representative Dan Fernandez, who is part of the cast of Honor Thy Father, filed a resolution that directs the House of Representatives to conduct an inquiry regarding the disqualification of Honor Thy Father.
The committee on Metro Manila Development, chaired by Quezon City Representative Winston Castelo, started the probe on the disqualification case of Honor Thy Father and the ticket-swapping incidents in January 2016.

Pullout of Nilalang and Honor Thy Father from some cinemas
Nilalang director Pedring Lopez and co-producer Wesley Villarica expressed dismay over the pullout of their film and co-entrant film, Honor thy Father from some cinemas in favor of My Bebe Love and Beauty and the Bestie. Villarica noted that his film, was shown in 20 cinemas in Metro Manila and 7 theaters outside the metropolis in the opening day on December 25, but by next day less than 20 cinemas are screening his film. Honor Thy Father writer Michiko Yamamoto said that her film was pulled out from ten theaters the day after the opening day of the festival.

Conflict of interest against Dominic Du
During the House probe on the MMFF irregularities, it was revealed that Dominic Du, a member of MMFF Executive Committee have a conflict of interest with the Best Picture winner, #Walang Forever and 2nd Best Picture winner, Buy Now, Die Later. Dominic Du owns the company, Axinite Digicinema, that helped promote the said two films. He also serves as a legal counsel of Joji Alonso, the producer of both films.

Box Office gross
The Metro Manila Development Authority was criticized for not releasing official earnings of each film. This led to some film studios releasing their own earnings.

References

External links 
 

Metro Manila Film Festival
MMFF
MMFF
MMFF
MMFF
MMFF
December 2015 events in the Philippines
January 2016 events in the Philippines